The Free High School Science Texts (FHSST) organization is a South African non-profit project, which creates open textbooks on scientific subjects. Textbooks are edited to follow the government's syllabus, and published under a Creative Commons license (CC BY), allowing teachers and students to print them or share them digitally.

History
FHSST was conceived in 2002 by Mark Horner, a physicist, when some rural South African children asked him to proofread notes that they had taken on a talk he gave on wave phenomena. The children intended to take the notes back to their schoolmates to use as a textbook on the subject.

Subjects
FHSST has released books for grades 10-12 on physics, chemistry and mathematics. They are developing books in life sciences and computer literacy and a guide to teach students how to study.

See also
 OpenCourseWare
 Open educational resources
 Open textbook
 Bookboon
 China Open Resources for Education
 Connexions
 Curriki
 Flat World Knowledge
 Flexbook
 Khan Academy
 MIT OpenCourseWare
 National Programme on Technology Enhanced Learning India
 Open.Michigan
 Tufts OpenCourseWare

References

External links
 

Open content
Science textbooks